MacCAM (often written as MacCam, Mac-Cam or Mac Cam) is a system of slow-motion cameras developed by FastCAM Replay LLC and DEL Imaging Systems LLC used during tennis matches to replay close or controversial line calls. The system is named after John McEnroe, who was infamous for contesting umpire calls. CBS was the first network to use the MacCam widely, as John McEnroe was one of their tennis analysts.

History
The MacCam was used at the 2004 U.S. Open to demonstrate several poor calls by chair umpires. In Serena Williams' controversial quarterfinal loss to Jennifer Capriati, several poor calls were contested by Williams. Television replays demonstrated that there were actually several crucial calls that were obviously erroneous. Following this match, the chair umpire Mariana Alves did not officiate for the remainder of the tournament; this however was not punitive, as commonly thought, as she was not scheduled to officiate. A major limitation of the MacCAM was that it could only evaluate the baseline—not sidelines or service line calls.  It was ultimately supplanted by Hawk-Eye and similar technologies.

Details
The MacCAM system has since been replaced at the US Open as well as other supporting tournaments with the ShotSpot system. In the US Open it was available only where the venue has necessary equipment (Arthur Ashe stadium).

Trivia
 Though trademarked by FastCAM Replay, the phrase "Mac Cam" is sometimes used generically by American media to refer to any manual or automated line monitoring, ball tracking or replay system, including Hawk-Eye, Cyclops, PointTracker and Auto-Ref.

References

Tennis equipment
Sports officiating technology